Namugoga Solar Power Station is a 50 megawatt solar power plant, under development in Uganda. 

 the solar farm is under construction and may be finished later in the year.

Location
The power station is in Namugoga Village, Busiro County, Wakiso District, in the Central Region of Uganda.

Overview
When completed, the power station will have an installed capacity of 50 megawatts, to be sold directly to the Uganda Electricity Transmission Company Limited, the sole authorized purchaser. The electricity will be evacuated from the station to a substation in Kisubi for integration into the national electricity grid, via a new 33kV high voltage transmission line.

Developers
A consortium comprising two companies, one local and one international, were granted the confession to design, develop, own, operate and maintain the power station: (a) Solar Power for Africa, a Ugandan solar power equipment vendor (b) Naanovo Energy Inc., a Canadian alternative energy developer. According to a 2010 published report, the development has been delayed because the developers have offered to generate power at US 15 cents per kilowatt-hour while less costly hydropower plants generate at only US 7 cents per kilowatt-hour.

See also

List of power stations in Uganda
Electricity Regulatory Authority
Tororo Thermal Power Station
Soroti Solar Power Station

References

External links
 Uganda Secures Funding for Key Solar PV Projects
 Uganda To Increase Power Generation
 Uganda Energy Situation In 2014

Solar power stations in Uganda
Wakiso District